"" (English: Oh! Shall I tell you, Mama) is a popular children's song in France. Since its composition in the 18th century, the melody has been applied to numerous lyrics in multiple languages – the English-language song "Twinkle, Twinkle, Little Star" is one such example. It was adapted in Twelve Variations on "Ah vous dirai-je, Maman" by Wolfgang Amadeus Mozart.

History 
According to Henri-Irénée Marrou, the origin of the melody is an anonymous pastoral song dating from 1740, with children's lyrics added relatively recently. The melody was first published in 1761.

Nursery rhyme

The French lyrics of the nursery rhyme exist in several variations, of which the following one is one of the most common versions.

"La Confidence naïve" 

The lyrics of the nursery rhyme are a parody of the original lyrics, an anonymous love poem, "" ("The naive Confidence").

Appearances of the melody

Many songs in various languages have been based on the "" melody. In English, "Twinkle, Twinkle, Little Star", the "Alphabet Song" and "Baa, Baa, Black Sheep" are all based on this melody.

The German Christmas carol "" with words by Hoffmann von Fallersleben, also uses the melody, as does the Hungarian Christmas carol "", the Dutch "", the Spanish "", the Greek "Φεγγαράκι μου λαμπρό", the Turkish "" and the Swedish "".

Several classical compositions have been inspired by this tune:

 Wolfgang Amadeus Mozart, Twelve Variations on "Ah vous dirai-je, Maman" (K. 265 / K. 300e) (1781 or 1782)
 Michel Corrette (Variations on) "Ah! Vous dirais-je, maman" from La Belle Vielleuse (1783)
 Johann Christoph Friedrich Bach, Variations on "Ah vous dirai-je maman" in G major (Wf XII: 2) (BR A 45) (Composed around 1785/90; 1st publ. ca. 1880)
 Joseph Haydn, Symphony No. 94 (Surprise Symphony), second movement (andante) (1792)
  (1760–1803), Variations for harp on "Ah! vous dirai-je, maman"
 Ferdinando Carulli, (1770-1841) Three Solos with Variations for Guitar, Op. 60, No. 3, c. 1812
 Theodor von Schacht (1748–1823), 3rd movement (Allegretto con variazioni) of his clarinet concerto in B flat major
 Franz Liszt, Album Leaf: "Ah! vous dirai-je, maman" (1833) (S.163b)
 Christian Heinrich Rinck, Variations and finale for organ on "Ah! vous dirai-je, maman", op. 90 (pub. 1828)
 Adolphe Adam, Bravura Variations from the opera Le toréador (1849)
 Camille Saint-Saëns, The Carnival of the Animals (1886), 12th movement (Fossiles) quotes the tune
 Ernst von Dohnányi, Variations on a Nursery Tune, Op. 25 (1914)
 Erwin Schulhoff, Ten Variations on "Ah! vous dirai-je, maman" and Fugue, Op. 16 (1914)
 Harl McDonald, Children's Symphony, 2nd theme of 1st movement ("Baa, Baa, Black Sheep" variant) (1948)
 Xavier Montsalvatge, 3rd movement (Allegretto) of Sonatine pour Yvette (1962)
 Vashti Bunyan, "Lily Pond" on the 1970 album Just Another Diamond Day
 John Corigliano, The Mannheim Rocket (2000)

References

French folk songs
Traditional children's songs
French nursery rhymes
French children's songs
18th-century songs